Rabidosa santrita is a species of wolf spider in the family Lycosidae. It is found in the United States.

References

Lycosidae
Articles created by Qbugbot
Spiders described in 1942